WILA may refer to:

 WILA (defunct), a defunct radio station (92.1 FM) licensed to Woodstock, Illinois, which operated from 1948 until 1950.
 WILA (FM), a radio station (100.1 FM) licensed to serve Live Oak, Florida, United States.
 WWDN, a radio station (1580 AM) licensed to serve Danville, Virginia, United States, which held the call sign WILA from 1957 to 2009
 Western Intercollegiate Lacrosse Association (WILA), a defunct NCAA lacrosse-only athletic conference.

See also
 Wila (disambiguation)